Jordan Branch, Nova Scotia  is a community in the Municipality
of the District of Shelburne, Nova Scotia, Canada.

See also 

 List of communities in Nova Scotia

References

General Service Areas in Nova Scotia
Communities in Shelburne County, Nova Scotia